OTP Banka Srbija (full legal name: OTP Banka Srbija a.d. Novi Sad), formerly known as Vojvođanska banka, is a bank operating in Serbia, with its headquarters in Novi Sad. It is a member of Hugnarian OTP Bank Group.

History

The Hungarian OTP Bank Group entered the Serbian banking market under the name "OTP banka Srbija" on 21 May 2007, being formed through the merger of three Serbian banks: Niška Banka a.d. Niš, Zepter banka a.d. Beograd and Kulska banka a.d. Novi Sad.

In December 2017, OTP Bank bought 100% of shares of Vojvođanska banka from the National Bank of Greece, thus was becoming the sixth-largest commercial bank in Serbia with banking market share of 6%.

In May 2019, the process of integration of OTP banka Srbija and Vojvođanska banka was finalized, and OTP Bank as majority owner decided to operate under name "Vojvođanska banka" on Serbian market. As of 2019, Vojvođanska banka is among the top ten largest banks in Serbia by asset size. With the fourth-largest network in Serbia, four regional business centers for small and medium-sized enterprises and with over a million clients, Vojvođanska banka covers the entire territory of the country.

In September 2019, OTP Bank officially bought Société Générale Srbija after the agreement was made in December 2018, and the process of integration is planned to be finalized in 2021. The bank fully merged on 30 April 2021.

Gallery

See also
 List of banks in Serbia
 OTP banka Srbija a.d.
 Vojvođanska banka

References

External links
 

Banks established in 1995
Banks of Serbia
Companies based in Novi Sad
Serbian brands
Serbian companies established in 1995